Mississippi River Bridge may refer to:

 Mississippi River Bridge (I-35W) or I-35W Mississippi River bridge, a bridge in Minnesota that collapsed in 2007
 Mississippi River Bridge (Vicksburg, Mississippi) or Old Vicksburg Bridge
 Mississippi River Bridge (La Crosse, Wisconsin)

See also
 Lists of crossings of the Mississippi River
 New Mississippi River Bridge or Stan Musial Veterans Memorial Bridge, a bridge between St. Clair County and St. Louis

 Jovany